RARIK is the official energy corporation of Iceland. It began operations on January 1 1947. In the early years RARIK built several power plants and in 1954 enacted a 10-year electrification plan to provide remote rural areas with electricity. RARIK built, among others, Lagarfoss and Mjolka Power Station II, both of which began operating in 1975.

References

External links
Official site 

Energy companies of Iceland
Energy companies established in 1947
1947 establishments in Iceland